You Will  may refer to:
You Will, an AT&T marketing campaign
You Will (album), by Anne Murray
You Will (song), by Anne Murray, later recorded by Patty Loveless